Saliha Sultan may refer to:

 Saliha Dilaşub Sultan (died 1690), second Haseki of Sultan Ibrahim and mother and Valide Sultan of Sultan Suleiman II
 Saliha Sultan (mother of Mahmud I) (1680–1739), consort of Sultan Mustafa II and mother and Valide Sultan of Sultan Mahmud I
 Saliha Sultan (daughter of Ahmed III) (1715–1778), Ottoman princess
 Saliha Sultan (daughter of Mahmud II) (1811–1843), Ottoman princess
 Saliha Sultan (daughter of Abdülaziz) (1862–1941), Ottoman princess